is a large trans-Neptunian object from the scattered disc located in the outermost region of the Solar System. It is one of the most distant objects from the Sun at 60.5 AU. It was discovered on 19 September 2014, by American astronomer Scott Sheppard at the Cerro Tololo Observatory, Chile, and was provisionally designated .

Orbit and classification 

This minor planet orbits the Sun at a distance of 35.0–88.4 AU once every 484 years and 10 months (177,075 days; semi-major axis of 61.71 AU). Its orbit has an eccentricity of 0.43 and an inclination of 18° with respect to the ecliptic.

It is classified as a scattered disc object, or "near-scattered" object in the classification of the Deep Ecliptic Survey, that still gravitationally interacts with Neptune (30.1 AU) due to its relatively low perihelion of 35.0 AU, contrary to the extended-scattered/detached objects and sednoids which never approach Neptune as close.

Most distant objects from the Sun 

 is moving closer to the Sun and will come to perihelion in 2106. , it is at 60.5 AU from the Sun, which makes it one of the most distant objects in the Solar System.

Physical characteristics 

, no rotational lightcurve for this object has been obtained from photometric observations. The body's rotation period, pole and shape remain unknown.

See also 
 List of possible dwarf planets
 List of Solar System objects most distant from the Sun

References

External links 
 List Of Centaurs and Scattered-Disk Objects, Minor Planet Center
 
 

Trans-Neptunian objects

Minor planet object articles (unnumbered)

20140919